Harold "Hal" DeWindt was an American producer, director, actor, and model. He worked to increase opportunities for African Americans in the arts.

Early life
DeWindt was born and raised in Harlem. His father Clifford acted with the original Lafayette Theatre.

Career
In 1959, DeWindt became the first male model for the Ebony Fashion Fair. He traveled with that fashion troupe for two years.

DeWindt began his stage career in the Broadway play Golden Boy. He played a leading role in the Louis S. Peterson play Entertain A Ghost. He also appeared in the Kurt Weill musical Lost in the Stars. In 1962, DeWindt staged an Off-Broadway production of Raisin' Hell in the Son, a spoof of A Raisin in the Sun that he co-wrote with Reni Santoni.

DeWindt served as production stage manager at the New York Shakespeare Festival for seven years. He was a director with Robert Hooks's Group Theater Workshop, which led to the creation of the Negro Ensemble Company, which he served with as a workshop director.

DeWindt was the founder and artistic director of the American Theatre of Harlem, and artistic director of the Inner City Repertory Company in Los Angeles. In 1977, he formed the Hal DeWindt Theatre in San Francisco.

DeWindt helped Arthur Mitchell bring the Dance Theatre of Harlem to Broadway, and helped Leonard Bernstein bring black musicians into the New York Philharmonic. In 1969, as assistant producer of The Angel Levine, DeWindt helped run a black apprenticeship program funded by a Ford Foundation grant. He also worked on a number of other film and television productions, and led acting workshops. DeWindt acted on television as well.

In 1983, DeWindt co-authored the book Kill, Bubba, Kill! with former NFL player and actor Bubba Smith. DeWindt was serving as an acting professor at Loyola Marymount University at the time of his death.

Personal life and death
In 1958, DeWindt and his wife Violet had their first child, Hal D. Jr. In 1975, DeWindt met actress Sheila Wills when she enrolled in an actor's workshop he was teaching in Los Angeles. They married two years later. The couple divorced in 1981. In 1984, DeWindt married actress/model Angelique. He later married another woman, Suzanne.

DeWindt died of cancer in Los Angeles on June 22, 1997. The New York Times reported his age at death as 63.

Filmography (selected)

References

External links
 

1997 deaths
African-American film producers
Film producers from New York (state)
American male stage actors
American male television actors
American theatre directors
African-American television directors
American television directors
Television producers from New York City
African-American male actors
African-American male models
African-American models
American male models
Male actors from New York City